Intrust Bank Arena is a 15,004-seat multi-purpose arena in Wichita, Kansas, United States.  It is located on the northeast corner of Emporia and Waterman streets in downtown Wichita.  The arena is the second largest indoor arena in the state of Kansas, behind Allen Fieldhouse at KU, which seats 16,300.  Locally, it has more seating than Charles Koch Arena at WSU, which seats 10,506.  The arena features 22 suites, 2 party suites, and over 300 premium seats.  It is owned by the government of Sedgwick County and operated by ASM Global.  

It is home to Wichita Thunder (ice hockey team) and previously to Wichita Force (indoor football team).  The Wichita State Shockers men's basketball team uses the arena as an alternate site for games that attract more fans than can be accommodated at its on-campus arena, Charles Koch Arena. The arena hosted first and second-round games for the NCAA Division I women's basketball tournament in 2011 and the NCAA Division I men's basketball tournament in 2018. The arena is also scheduled to host 1st and 2nd-round games of the men's tournament in 2025, as well as a regional for Sweet 16 and Elite 8 games in the 2022 women's tournament. The arena was scheduled to host the 2021 tournament, until the NCAA announced all games would be held at the state of Indiana due to the COVID-19 pandemic. On December 29, 2018, the UFC announced that Intrust Bank Arena would host the first ever UFC event held in Kansas.

History 
The facility was known as Sedgwick County Arena during early planning stages.  It was meant to replace the Kansas Coliseum north of Wichita.

On November 9, 2004, Sedgwick County voters approved the downtown arena at a projected construction cost of $183,625,241 by a 52–48% vote. On April 4, 2005, Governor Kathleen Sebelius signed the Intrust Bank Arena tax bill authorizing Sedgwick County to collect a 1% sales tax beginning July 1, 2005 for 30 months. On January 10, 2008, Sedgwick County announced it had reached a 25-year, $8.75 million naming rights deal with Wichita-based Intrust Bank, the largest bank headquartered in Kansas. This complements a 20-year, $3 million deal with Cessna Aircraft Company to name an adjacent outdoor plaza, and a concourse area deal with Spirit AeroSystems.

It was announced on March 9, 2010, that the Intrust Bank Arena was voted the 'Best Arena' and 'Best Locker Rooms' and also voted third in the 'Best Press Box' category in the Central Hockey League's annual 'Best of the Best' poll. The Intrust Bank Arena cracked Pollstar's Top 50 Arena Venues for ticket sales during the first quarter of 2010. Intrust Bank Arena ranked 22nd in the United States and 45th worldwide. In 2010, net profit was $2,010,736 with depreciation of $4.4 million.
In 2011, net profit was $389,659.
In 2012, net profit was $703,000. Metallica set the all-time attendance record for a single-concert when it hosted 15,690 fans at the sold-out show on March 4, 2019.

The arena is owned by the government of Sedgwick County, and operated by ASM Global (itself owned by The Anschutz Corporation through Anschutz Entertainment Group), making it a sister venue to the Orpheum Theatre also located in downtown Wichita that is separately owned by nonprofit Orpheum Performing Arts Centre LTD.

Events

College basketball

NBA preseason
 October 24, 2012 – Dallas Mavericks vs Oklahoma City Thunder
 October 23, 2013 – Chicago Bulls vs Oklahoma City Thunder
 October 17, 2014 – Toronto Raptors vs Oklahoma City Thunder

NHL preseason 
September 24, 2022 - St. Louis Blues vs Arizona Coyotes
September 23, 2023 - St. Louis Blues vs Arizona Coyotes

Bull riding 
 May 7 & 8, 2010 – PBR Built Ford Tough Series: Wichita Invitational
 September 23–24, 2011 – PBR Built Ford Tough Series: DEWALT Guaranteed Tough Invitational
 April 23, 2022 - PBR Pendleton Whisky Velocity Tour
April 22, 2023 - PBR Pendleton Whisky Velocity Tour

Combat sports 
 April 27, 2013 – VFC Fight Night: Wichita 1 Marcio Navarro vs Jake Lindsey
 March 9, 2019 – UFC Fight Night Wichita Derrick Lewis vs Junior Dos Santos
 April 8, 2022 - Bare Knuckle Fighting Championship 23

Concerts / Shows / Events 
{{hidden
| headercss = background: #ccccff; font-size: 100%; width: 100%;
| contentcss = text-align: left; font-size: 100%; width: 100%;
| header =List of Concerts / Shows / Events
| content =

2010

2011

2012

2013

2014

2015

2016

2017

2018

2019

2020

2021

2022

Gallery

See also

 List of NCAA Division I basketball arenas

References

External links 

 
 Sedgwick County 

Indoor arenas in Kansas
Indoor ice hockey venues in the United States
Sports venues in Kansas
Sports venues in Wichita, Kansas
Wichita State Shockers men's basketball
Wichita Thunder
Sports venues completed in 2010
Anschutz Corporation